Alceo Lipizer (April 8, 1921 – September 4, 1990) is a retired Italian professional football player. He was born in Fiume.

Honours
U.S. Fiumana
Serie C: 1940-41

Como
Serie B: 1948-49

External links
 Alceo Lipitzer at encclopediadelcalcio.it

1921 births
1990 deaths
Italian footballers
Serie A players
U.S. Fiumana players
Taranto F.C. 1927 players
Juventus F.C. players
Como 1907 players
A.C. Reggiana 1919 players
Association football midfielders